Family Feud is a Philippine television game show based on the American series of the same name, which has aired on multiple networks in four iterations since 2001.

The first, on ABC, was hosted by Ogie Alcasid. It premiered on November 19, 2001, and ended after 172 episodes on December 28, 2002.

The second series, originally hosted by Richard Gomez (2008–2009), then Dingdong Dantes (2009–2010), and Edu Manzano (2011), premiered on GMA Network on October 13, 2008, and ended after 324 episodes on July 1, 2011.

The third series, hosted by Luis Manzano on ABS-CBN, premiered on April 9, 2016, and ended after 109 episodes on May 7, 2017.

The fourth series premiered on GMA Network on March 21, 2022 with Dantes returning as host. On December 17, 2022, the show announced a temporary hiatus, to start airing replays of past episodes on December 19, 2022, and began airing fresh episodes again on January 9, 2023.

The series is streaming online on YouTube.

Accolades

References

External links
 
 

TV5 (Philippine TV network) original programming
2001 Philippine television series debuts
2002 Philippine television series endings
2008 Philippine television series debuts
2011 Philippine television series endings
2016 Philippine television series debuts
2017 Philippine television series endings
2022 Philippine television series debuts
ABS-CBN original programming
Family Feud
Filipino-language television shows
GMA Network original programming
Philippine game shows
Philippine television series based on American television series